The Torquay Marine Spa was a spa and entertainment complex situated on a promontory overlooking Beacon Cove in the town of Torquay, Devon, England. The buildings included a ballroom, concert hall, sunlit conservatory and private bathing facilities. There was also a large public swimming bath open to the sea below these.

History 
The Marine Spa baths were opened in 1857 after four years of construction.

The complex was demolished, beginning on 27 December 1971. The site was subsequently redeveloped as the Coral Island complex, a leisure resort which was also demolished, in 1997.

From 2003 to 2020 the site was occupied by Living Coasts, a coastal zoo. Its permanent closure was announced on 16 June 2020 due to its high cost base, a need to make efficiencies and inability to afford required substantial maintenance. Homes were sought for the zoo's animals.

References 

Torquay
Spas
Buildings and structures demolished in 1971
Demolished buildings and structures in England